Ēriks Ševčenko (born April 28, 1991 in Daugavpils, Latvian SSR, Soviet Union) is a Latvian professional ice hockey player. He currently plays for Metallurg Novokuznetsk of the Supreme Hockey League.

Ševčenko previously played 31 games in the Kontinental Hockey League for Dinamo Riga.

Ševčenko has also played for the Latvia national team. He has a younger brother, Aturs Ševčenko, who also plays hockey.

References

External links
 

1991 births
Florida Everblades players
Gwinnett Gladiators players
HK Riga players
Latvian ice hockey defencemen
HK Liepājas Metalurgs players
Living people
San Francisco Bulls players
Saryarka Karagandy players
Sportspeople from Daugavpils
Tønsberg Vikings players
Tsen Tou Jilin City players
HC Yugra players
Yunost Minsk players